Ya'akov Shefi (born 25 January 1941) is an Israeli former politician who served as a member of the Knesset for the Labor Party from 1992 until 1996.

Biography
Born in Petah Tikva during the Mandate period, Shefi was educated at the Israeli Air Force's technical school. He worked as an administrator, and was a member of the Petah Tikva Workers Council and the central committee of the Histadrut trade union. He was also a member of the board at Hapoel Petah Tikva and of the Israel Football Association's administration.

A member of the Labor Party, he was elected to the Knesset on the party's list in 1992. He was a member of several committees until losing his seat in the 1996 elections.

References

External links

1941 births
People from Petah Tikva
Jews in Mandatory Palestine
Israeli trade unionists
Living people
Israeli Labor Party politicians
Members of the 13th Knesset (1992–1996)